CC1, CC-1 or cc1 may refer to:
 cc1, the first phase of the C compiler in the GNU Compiler Collection
 CC-1, the hull designation for the first US battlecruiser that was finished as the Lexington-class aircraft carrier 
 , a Royal Canadian Navy submarine
 CIÉ No. CC1, an experimental Irish steam locomotive
 CC1, a data channel used in Line 21 closed captioning
 Southern Railway (UK) CC1, an electric locomotive of the type later known as British Rail Class 70
 CC1, a hovercraft built by Cushioncraft
 Dhoby Ghaut MRT station, Singapore

See also
 CCI (disambiguation)